

The Tapanee Levitation 4 is a Canadian four-seat STOL aircraft designed to be homebuilt by Michel Lequin for Tapanee Aviation of Mont-Saint-Michel, Quebec.

Design and development
A larger version of the companies earlier Pegazair bushplane, the Levitation is a high-wing monoplane with V-strut bracing, leading edge slats and Junkers flaperons. Powered by a  Lycoming O-360 flat-six piston engine with a two-blade propeller. The Leviation has a fixed conventional landing gear with a tailwheel and a cabin holding a pilot and three passengers in two rows of side-by-side seating. By December 2004 five kits had been sold.

Specifications

See also

References
Notes

Bibliography

External links

Homebuilt aircraft
2000s Canadian civil utility aircraft
Tapanee Aviation aircraft
High-wing aircraft
STOL aircraft
Aircraft first flown in 2002